The Mixed 4 × 100 metre freestyle relay competition of the 2016 European Aquatics Championships was held on 20 May 2016.

Records
Prior to the competition, the existing world, European and championship records were as follows.

Results

Heats
The heats were held at 11:18.

Final
The final was held at 19:39.

References

Mixed 4 x 100 metre freestyle relay
European